Nicholas Cradock is an Australian actor, most commonly known for his role in the 2014 - 2016 production of Les Misérables touring Australia. Cradock has performed in multiple musicals, stage plays and films. Cradock recently starred in both seasons of the Emmy Award winning program, Hardball as Lance. Cradock performed in the world premiere of Dream Lover: the Bobby Darin Musical in 2016 as Young Bobby Darrin / Dodd at the Sydney Lyric Theatre. Cradock is also known for his role on the television program Wiggle, Wiggle, Wiggle!; where he played the Mini Red Wiggle.

Performances

Musical theatre 
Cradock toured with the 25th anniversary production of Les Misérables around Australia as Gavroche. Cradock also toured Australia with Bonnie Lythgoe's Peter Pan. Cradock went on to feature in the world premiere of Dream Lover: the Bobby Darin Musical starring alongside David Campbell. Cradock also notably starred alongside Trevor Ashley in The Bodybag at the Sydney Opera House.

Short films 
 Dreamweaver (2017)

Television 
Cradock starred as the Mini Red Wiggle (Simon Pryce) in the television program Wiggle, Wiggle, Wiggle!, directed by Anthony Field. Cradock also starred as Lance in both seasons of the Emmy Award winning program Hardball. Cradock starts in Channel 7's News of the Wild.

Competition 
Cradock was a finalist in the Kimmy V The Music: A Live Singing Contest (That's Live) live charity performance on YouTube on 15 May 2020. Cradock performed 'Gonna Be Famous' and 'Bunny and Kitty'. Cradock performed to Daniel Radcliffe, Tina Fey, Ellie Kemper and Tituss Burgess.

References

External links
 
 https://vimeo.com/238519819

Living people
2005 births
Australian male musical theatre actors
Australian male film actors
Male actors from Sydney